Monbatsu is the Japanese language term for the old Japanese aristocracy and nobility. The daimyō system was abolished with the Meiji Restoration. This did not, however, dismantle all the aspects of the clan system, nor achieve a thorough land reform. The Monbatsu persisted as a recognised block having political influence, into the twentieth century.

See also
Gunbatsu
Zaibatsu
Kazoku

Japanese nobility
Japanese historical terms